Online Paw Ka Wit Nyin is a 2015 Burmese romantic horror film, directed by Nyi Nyi Htun Lwin starring Nay Toe, Phway Phway, Zay Ye Htet and Chan Mi Mi Ko. The film, produced by  Lavender Film Production premiered in Myanmar on January 30, 2015.

Cast
Nay Toe as Soe Shein Thar
Phway Phway as Shin Min Sett
Zay Ye Htet as Khant Lu
Chan Mi Mi Ko as Than Zin Tay
Aung Lwin as Uncle San

References

External links

2015 films
2010s Burmese-language films
Burmese horror films
Films shot in Myanmar
2015 horror films